Kazaz is a collection of villages and small towns that are in a short distance from Arak, Iran.

Populated places in Arak County